

See also
Comparison of California ski resorts
Comparison of Colorado ski resorts
List of ski areas and resorts in the United States

References

Ski areas and resorts
 
 
Lists of ski areas and resorts
Ski resorts, North American
Skiing in North America